Tommy Candy Shop Sugar Me is the fourth studio album by Tommy 6, released on June 12, 2013, through Warner Music Japan. The album debuted at #4 on the Oricon Japan chart. It is Tommy 6's first album to be written predominantly in English. It is also february6's first album that wasn't written entirely by Tomoko Kawase. Tommy Candy Shop Sugar Me is the february6 counterpart to heavenly6's Tommy Ice Cream Heaven Forever.

Release and promotion
The album's first single, "Be My Valentine" was announced in December 2012 as a special Valentine's Day single. The single was released as planned on February 6, 2013, debuting at number twenty-six on the Oricon weekly singles chart, and peaking at number twenty-five on the Billboard Japan Hot 100.  A cover of The Brilliant Green's "Ai no ♥ Ai no Hoshi" was included as a B-side in honor of the band's 15th anniversary.

"Runaway", the second single from the album, was announced in April 2013, along with the formal announcement of the album. Runaway is sung completely in English. Starting on April 8, 2013, "Runaway" was used as the ending theme song for TV Tokyo's Jitsuryoku Sekai no Mystery. "Runaway", along with "Sugar ♥ Me" were released as a double a-side promotional single on June 5, 2013.

Tomoko Kawase appeared on the cover of Volume # of Marquee magazine, promoting the album.

Tommy Candy Shop Sugar Me was released in regular and limited editions. The limited edition included a DVD with the music videos for "Runaway" and "Sugar Me", as well as special packaging and a sticker sheet. Albums per-ordered from certain retailers came with a limited edition poster.

Track listing
The official track listing and cover art were posted to the Warner Music Japan site on May 20, 2013.

All music composed and arranged by Malibu Convertible.

Personnel
 Tomoko Kawase – vocals, production
 Malibu Convertible – production
 James De Barrado – vocals

Chart positions

Certifications

References

External links
 Tommy february6 official website
 Tommy february6 discography

Tomoko Kawase albums
2013 albums
Warner Music Japan albums